Jaroslav Svoboda (born June 1, 1980) is a Czech former professional ice hockey right winger. He played in the National Hockey League with the Carolina Hurricanes and Dallas Stars between 2001 and 2006. The rest of his career, which lasted from 1997 to 2017, was mainly spent in the Czech Extraliga. Internationally Svoboda played for the Czech national junior team at the European U18 Championships and the World Junior Championships, winning a gold medal at the 2000 World Juniors.

Biography
Svoboda was born in Červenka, Czechoslovakia. As a youth, he played in the 1994 Quebec International Pee-Wee Hockey Tournament with a team from Olomouc.

Svoboda was drafted in the 8th round, 208th overall by the Carolina Hurricanes in the 1998 NHL Entry Draft and spent three seasons with the team, sharing his time in the American Hockey League with the Lowell Lock Monsters. After spending a season in the Czech Republic during the NHL lockout, Svoboda signed with the Dallas Stars in 2005 and managed to play 43 regular season games for them. In total, Svoboda has played 134 regular season games and has scored 12 goals and 17 assists for 29 points.  He has also played in 25 playoff games (23 with Carolina in 2001-02).

He returned to Europe in 2006, and later played for HC Znojemští Orli in the Czech Extraliga.

Career statistics

Regular season and playoffs

International

References

External links
 

1980 births
Living people
Carolina Hurricanes draft picks
Carolina Hurricanes players
Cincinnati Cyclones (IHL) players
Czech ice hockey right wingers
Dallas Stars players
HC Kometa Brno players
HC Lev Praha players
HC Nové Zámky players
HC Oceláři Třinec players
HC Red Ice players
HC Sparta Praha players
Kootenay Ice players
Lowell Lock Monsters players
MHC Martin players
Orli Znojmo players
People from Olomouc District
Piráti Chomutov players
Sportspeople from the Olomouc Region
Czech expatriate ice hockey players in Canada
Czech expatriate ice hockey players in the United States
Czech expatriate ice hockey players in Slovakia
Czech expatriate ice hockey players in Switzerland